Providence was a 30-gun pinnance in the service of the English Navy Royal. She spent her career in Home Waters. During the English Civil War she was employed in the Parliamentary Naval Force. In 1551 she was assigned to the Commonwealth Navy. She was in the Battle of Gabbard. Upon the Restoration in 1660 she participated in the battles of Lowestoffe, Four Days' Fight and Orfordness in 1666. She was converted to a fireship then sold in 1667.

Providence was the first named vessel in the English and royal Navies.

Construction and specifications
She was ordered on 12 December 1636 to be built under contract by Mr Tranckmore of St Savior's Dock at Bermondsry in London on the River Thames. She was launched on 21 March 1637. Their builder's measure was  tons.

Her gun armament was in 1638 30 guns. Under the 1666 establishment it consisted of six culverins, fourteen demi-culverines, fourteen sakers. Her manning was around 120 officers and men in 1652 and raised to 140 in 1653.

Commissioned service

Service in the English Navy Royal
She was commissioned in 1638 under the command of Captain Edward Seaman who held command into 1639. In 1640 she came under the command of Captain Richard Hill who held command until 1641.

Service during English Civil War and Commonwealth Navy
In 1642 she was commissioned into the Parliamentary Naval Forces under the command of Captain Strachan for service in the English Channel. In 1643 she was under command of Captain William Brooks then in 1644 Captain Thomas Plunkett (until suspended) for service in Irish Waters. Captain Plunkett was replaced by Captain John Ellison in 1644. From 1645 to 1647 she was under the command of John Stansby. For the winter of 1646-47 she was with the Winter Guard. In the spring of 1647 she moved to the Downs. Later in summer or fall 1647 she was under Captain John Mildmay in the Irish Sea. Sje was assigned to Warwick's Fleet at the Downs in September 1648. Captain John Pearce took command in 1649. She was with Robert Blake's Fleet blockading Lisbon in October 1650. She remained with the Fleet when they moved to the Irish Sea in 1651.

Service in the First Anglo-Dutch War
She was temporarily under the command of Captain George Swanley in May 1652. She was part of Robert Blake's Fleet at the Battle of Portland between 18 and 20 February 1653. She was a member of Red Squadron, Van Division that engaged the Dutch at the Battle of the Gabbard on 2-3 June 1653. On 31 July 1653 the fleets engaged again at the Battle of Scheveningen near Texel. During the engagement she was a member of Red Squadron, Van Division.

In 1654 she was under command of Captain Thomas Bunn followed by Captain Robert Kirby in 1655. Later in 1656 she was under command of Captain John Littlejohn with Robert Blake's Fleet. In 1658 she was under Captain John Pointz followed by Captain Giles Shelley in 1660, both for service off the coast of Scotland.

Service after the Restoration
On 19 March she was under Captain John Tyrwitt until 2 April 1665.

Sencond Anglo-Dutch War
On 16 April Captain Richard James took command. She was at the Battle of Lowestoft on 3 June 1665 as a member of Blue Squadron, Rear Division. The following year she was at the Four Days' Battle again as a member of Blue Squadron though as a member of the Van Division from 1 to 4 June 1666. She suffered two killed and six wounded. This was followed by  the St James Day Battle again as a member of Blue Squadron, Van Division on 25 July 1666. She was converted to a fireship in June 1667 and commissioned under Captain James Cooke on 10 June 1667. On 2 April she got a new commander, Captain Hugh Riley.

Disposition
HMS Providence was wrecked at Tangier on 31 October 1668.

Notes

Citations

References
 British Warships in the Age of Sail (1603 – 1714), by Rif Winfield, published by Seaforth Publishing, England © Rif Winfield 2009, EPUB :
 Fleet Actions, 1.5 Battle of Portland
 Fleet Actions, 1.7 Battle of the Gabbard
 Fleet Actions, 1.8 Battle of Scheveningen
 Fleet Actions, 3.1 Battle of Lowestoft
 Fleet Actions, 3.3 Battle of the Galloper Sand (the Four Days' Battle)
 # Fleet actions, 3.4 Battle of Orfordness (the St James Day Battle)
 Chapter 4, The Fourth Rates - 'Small Ships', Vessels Acquired from 24 March 1603, 1637 Group, Providence
 Ships of the Royal Navy, by J.J. Colledge, revised and updated by Lt-Cdr Ben Warlow and Steve Bush, published by Seaforth Publishing, Barnsley, Great Britain, © the estate of J.J. Colledge, Ben Warlow and Steve Bush 2020, EPUB , Section P (Providence)
 The Arming and Fitting of English Ships of War 1600 - 1815, by Brian Lavery, published by US Naval Institute Press © Brian Lavery 1989, Part V Guns, Type of Guns

 

Ships of the Royal Navy
1600s ships